The 1931 New York City aldermanic election took place on November 3 to elect the 65 members of the New York City Board of Aldermen. Republicans lost three of their four seats on the Board, all of which were located in Manhattan. In 21 of Brooklyn's 24 districts the vote was better than two to one for Democratic candidates, better than six to one for Democratic candidate William O'Reilly in the 38th district.

References

New York City Council elections
Aldermanic election
New York City aldermanic election
New York City aldermanic election
New York City aldermanic election